Dolman is a garment.

Dolman may also refer to:

Bob Dolman (born 1949), Canadian screenwriter, actor, director and producer
Charles Dolman (1807–1863)
Claude Ernest Dolman (1906–1994), Canadian academic and microbiologist
Dick Dolman (1935–2019), Dutch politician
Eric Dolman (1903–1969), Welsh cricketer
Evert Dolman (1946–1993), Dutch racing cyclist
Fiona Dolman (born 1970), Scottish actress
Harry Dolman (1897–1977), British businessman
John Dolman (died 1526), English clergyman
John Dolman (Jesuit)
Liam Dolman (born 1987), English footballer
Malcolm Dolman (born 1960), Australian cricketer
Nancy Dolman (1951–2010), Canadian actress and singer
Thomas Dolman (1622–1697)
William Dolman (coroner)

See also
Dolmen, a type of stone tomb
Dollman (disambiguation)